The Maserati 250F was a racing car made by Maserati of Italy used in '2.5 litre' Formula One racing between January 1954 and November 1960. Twenty-six examples were made.

Mechanical details
The 250F principally used the SSG 220 bhp (@ 7400 rpm) 2.5-litre Maserati A6 straight-six engine, ribbed 13.4" drum brakes, wishbone independent front suspension, a De Dion tube axle, Borrani 16" & 17" wheels and Pirelli Stella Bianca tyres. It was built by Gioacchino Colombo, Vittorio Bellentani and Alberto Massimino; the tubular work was by Valerio Colotti.
A streamlined version with bodywork which partially enclosed the wheels (similar to the 1954 Mercedes-Benz W196 "Typ Monza") was used in the 1956 French Grand Prix.

Racing history

The 250F first raced in the 1954 Argentine Grand Prix where Juan Manuel Fangio won the first of his two victories before he  left for the new Mercedes-Benz team. Fangio won the 1954 Drivers' World Championship, with points gained with both Maserati and Mercedes-Benz; Stirling Moss raced his own privately owned 250F for the full 1954 season. Prince Bira was another driver favouring the 250F.

In 1955 a 5-speed gearbox; SU fuel injection (240 bhp) and Dunlop disc brakes were introduced. Jean Behra drove this in a five-member works team which included Luigi Musso.

In 1956 Stirling Moss won the Monaco and Italian Grands Prix, both in a works car.

In 1956 three 250F T2 cars first appeared for the works drivers. Developed by Giulio Alfieri using lighter steel tubes they sported a slimmer, stiffer body and sometimes the new  V12 engine, although it offered little or no real advantage over the older straight 6. It was later developed into the 3 litre V12 that won two races powering the Cooper T81 and T86 from 1966 to 1969, the final "Tipo 10" variant of the engine having three valves and two spark plugs per cylinder.

In 1957 Juan Manuel Fangio drove to four more championship victories, including his final win at German Grand Prix at the Nürburgring (Aug. 4, 1957), where he overcame a 48-second deficit in 22 laps, passing the race leader, Mike Hawthorn, on the final lap to take the win. In doing so he broke the lap record at the Nürburgring, 10 times.

By the 1958 season, the 250F was totally outclassed by the new rear engined F1 cars.  However, the car remained a favourite with the privateers, including Maria Teresa de Filippis, and was used by back markers through the 1960 F1 season, the last for the 2.5 litre formula.

In total, the 250F competed in 46 Formula One championship races with 277 entries, leading to eight wins. Success was not limited to World Championship events with 250F drivers winning many non-championship races around the world.

Stirling Moss later said that the 250F was the best front-engined F1 car he drove.

World Championship wins

Non-World Championship wins

References

Notes

Bibliography

 
David McKinney, Maserati 250F,

External links

 250F Overview Article 
 Case history of 250F article with complete chassis data
 Top Gear 250F review

250F
Maserati Formula One cars
Cars introduced in 1954
Formula One championship-winning cars